Laphria gibbosa is a species of fly belonging to the family Asilidae.

Distribution
Europe.

References

Asilidae
Flies described in 1758
Taxa named by Carl Linnaeus
Asilomorph flies of Europe